Toink! Sino Ang Tama? (lit. Who's Right?) is a weekly afternoon game show broadcast and produced by TV5.

Mechanics
In the first round, the players will have to guess which 'TaKal' got the answer correctly. There are two questions and the player whose guess is right will get 100 points for each.

In the second round, the players will now have to guess who gave a wrong answer among the three. This round is worth 300 points.

In the third round, the players will have to guess correctly whether the person on the street got a right or wrong answer. For each correct answer, the players will get 500 points.

The pair with the higher number of points wins the eliminations and is guaranteed P30,000 pesos in cash. They will also proceed to the jackpot round where they can win the pot money.

In the jackpot round, they would have to pick one TaKal and guess if that person will give a right or wrong answer. If they predicted all three correctly, they win the jackpot and if not, the amount will be added to the pot money.

The game gets hilarious as people caught off-guard on the streets give crazy answers to seemingly easy questions.

The players will have to see through the minds of the TaKals and judge whether they are likely to give a correct or wrong answer.

The viewers and players, alike, will be surprised by how some people are really not as they appear.

Main hosts
 Alex Gonzaga
 Chris Tiu

Segment hosts
 Pretty Trisza
 Gene Padilla

See also
List of programs broadcast by TV5

References

Philippine game shows
TV5 (Philippine TV network) original programming
2012 Philippine television series debuts
2012 Philippine television series endings
Filipino-language television shows